The Scout movement in Serbia is served by several independent organizations:

 Savez Izviđača Srbije, member of the World Organization of the Scout Movement
 Okruzna Organizacija Skauta-Sverna Bačka, belonging to the World Federation of Independent Scouts (WFIS)
 Vajdasági Magyar Cserkészszövetség, Hungarian Scouts in Vojvodina linked to Magyar Cserkészszövetség

See also
 Scouting and Guiding in Kosovo

External links
 Vajdasági Magyar Cserkészszövetség